Great Basin College is a public college in Elko, Nevada. Opened in 1967 as Elko College, it was later renamed to Northern Nevada College and then to its current name. It has 3,836 students and is a member of the Nevada System of Higher Education.

History
After its opening in 1967, the college joined the University of Nevada system in August 1969. Formerly, hopes for a college in Elko were fading in the spring of 1968 until a $250,000 donation was received from reclusive Las Vegas billionaire Howard Hughes. The gift was announced by Nevada Governor Paul Laxalt, who was heading the list of dignitaries, at an emotionally charged assembly of supporters at the Commercial Hotel.

Academics
The college offers baccalaureate and associate level instruction in career and technical education and academic areas. It offers bachelor's degrees, Associate of Applied Science degrees, certificates, and short-term training programs.

Campuses

Great Basin College has its main campus in Elko, in northeastern Nevada. Great Basin College covers 86,500 square miles, two time zones, and ten of Nevada's largest counties.

Residence halls are available at the Elko campus. Branch campuses also serve the communities of Battle Mountain, Ely, Pahrump, and Winnemucca. Satellite centers are located in nearly 20 communities across rural Nevada.

References

External links
 Official website

1967 establishments in Nevada
Buildings and structures in Elko County, Nevada
Education in Elko County, Nevada
Educational institutions established in 1967
Elko, Nevada
Nevada System of Higher Education
Public universities and colleges in Nevada
Universities and colleges accredited by the Northwest Commission on Colleges and Universities